Brooklyn Tobacco Factory, also known as the Hightower & Barksdale Tobacco Factory, is a historic tobacco factory located at Brooklyn, Halifax County, Virginia. It was built about 1855, and is a two-story, brick building with a gable roof.  It features brick chimney flues projecting above the metal sheathed roof. Also on the property are two contributing pack houses (c. 1880) and the ruins of a log house (c. 1855). The factory was designed and built by Dabney Cosby, Jr., son of the Jeffersonian workman, Dabney Cosby, Sr.  The factory remained in operation until 1881.

It was listed on the National Register of Historic Places in 1996.

History 
The firm of Hightower & Barksdale began manufacturing plug chewing tobacco in 1855. The workforce was originally composed of slaves either belonging to the factory owners or hired from local planters. Hightower & Barksdale closed its operations in 1860, later to be briefly reopened in the early 1880s by Beverly Barksdale III and William Haymes.

In 1994 Virginia "Ginger" Gentry acquired the long-abandoned factory and with her husband Mack set about saving the factory from further deterioration. They have carefully preserved the graffiti and stenciling as a record of the factory's fascinating history.

The factory is listed in the Virginia Landmarks Register and in the National Register of Historic Places.

References

External links
 Brooklyn Tobacco Factory, 16040 River Road, Brooklyn, Halifax County, VA at the Historic American Buildings Survey (HABS)

Industrial buildings and structures on the National Register of Historic Places in Virginia
Industrial buildings completed in 1855
Buildings and structures in Halifax County, Virginia
National Register of Historic Places in Halifax County, Virginia
Historic American Buildings Survey in Virginia
Tobacco buildings in the United States